is a train station in Nagato, Yamaguchi Prefecture, Japan.

Lines 
West Japan Railway Company
Mine Line

Railway stations in Japan opened in 1924
Railway stations in Yamaguchi Prefecture